Kaathiruppor Pattiyal also known as Kathiruppor Pattiyal is a 2018 Indian Tamil language romantic  comedy drama film written and directed by Balaiya D. Rajasekhar on his directorial debut and produced by Baija Tom under the production company Lady Dream Cinemas and distributed by Lotus Five Star while co-produced by K.V Jayaram. The film stars debutant Sachin Mani in the male lead role and Nandita Swetha in the female lead role while Aruldoss, Manobala, Sendrayan, Mayilsamy, Arunraja Kamaraj, and Appukutty play pivotal and supportive roles in the film. Sean Roldan scored background music for the film. The movie was released on 4 May 2018 and received average reviews from critics upon the release.

Plot 
An RPF railway officer named Williams (Aruldoss) is miffed and frustrated, regarding the fact that the public did not respect the RPF cops. He decides to bring in strict rules and asks his subordinates not to show mercy towards defaulters who make offences and for those who mess up with the railway rules. With the help of his team, he nabs many passengers who violate rules in different ways, which include peeing on railway tracks and travelling on trains without tickets. On the other hand, Sathya (Sachin Mani) is a jobless man who falls in love with a girl named Megala (Nandita Swetha), who is from a rich family and holds a job for herself. Megala also falls in love with him, which was not tolerated by her father (Chitra Lakshmanan) and suddenly arranges for a marriage to his daughter. When Sathya gets to know about this, he urgently prepares himself to travel by train from Tambaram to Puducherry in order to convince Megala from the arranged marriage and to marry her, but his dreams were spoiled by Williams, as he was arrested by cops on his way for committing an offence and was taken into custody at the Tambaram railway station. Soon after, he meets prisoners Baskar (Sendrayan), Kunjitha Badham (Manobala), Kutti Puli (Arunraja Kamaraj), Sathish (Appukutty), and Kodeeswaran (Mayilsamy) and narrates his love story to them. After being impressed by the story, the prisoners hatch a plan to help Sathya to escape from police custody.

Cast 
 Sachin Mani as Sathya, jobless lover of Megala
 Nandita Swetha as Megala, lover of Sathya from a rich family
 Aruldoss as Williams, an arrogant RPF inspector
 Manobala as Kunjitha Badham, a sex doctor
 Arunraja Kamaraj as Kutti Puli, an ardent fan of M. Sasikumar after watching one of his films, Kutti Puli
 Appukutty as Sathish, one of the prisoners whom Sathya befriends
 Sendrayan as Baskar, a wannabe filmmaker
 Mayilsamy as Kodeeswaran, a street beggar
 Chitra Lakshmanan as Megala's father
 Rajendran as Megala's father's assistant
 Muthukaalai
 Bava Lakshmanan
 Supergood Subramani

Production  
The filmmaker Balaiya D. Rajasekhar made his directorial debut through this venture and started its shooting process in 2017 and finished within a couple of months as a less budgeted film and was slated to an initial release on 2 March 2018 before its original release on 4 May 2018. The production team decided the film to be a simple and interesting premise set against an intriguing backdrop and the film was filmed and shot in Pondicherry.

The production team roped in newcomer Sachin Mani to play male lead role alongside Nandita Swetha in the female lead role. Aruldoss was chosen to play a serious role of a railway inspector in the most parts of the film despite being treated as a comedy drama film.

The team also hired well known editor Ruben for editing and roped in M. Sukumar as the cinematographer. The art direction was handled by Lalgudi N. Ilayaraja who previously worked as an art director for the Vijay starrer Kaththi.

Soundtrack 
The background music of the film is composed by Sean Roldan. The album was released on 13 November 2017 featuring four songs.

References

External links 

 

2018 directorial debut films
2010s Tamil-language films
Indian romantic comedy-drama films
2018 comedy-drama films
Films scored by Sean Roldan
2018 romantic comedy-drama films